Devil in Agbada is a 2021 Nigerian action drama film written, produced by Chinneylove Eze and directed by Umanu Elijah. The film stars Erica Nlewedim, Linda Osifo, and Efe Irele. The official poster of the film was unveiled in March 2021. The film had its special premiere on 27 June 2021 and had its official theatrical release on 2 July 2021 and opened to mixed reviews from critics but emerged as a success at the box office. The film is loosely inspired from the elements of Hollywood.

Cast 
 Linda Osifo as Irene
 Efe Irele as Okikiola
 Erica Nlewedim as Tomi
 Uzor Arukwe as Machado
 Akin Lewis as Otunba Shonibare
 Uche Jombo
 Alexx Ekubo
 Nosa Rex
 Etinosa Idemudia
 Desmond Elliot
 Alexander Okeke
 Soso Sobrekan

Plot 
Three young women Irene, Okikiola, and Tomi collaborate and team up together to achieve the mission of bringing down Otunda Shonibare, a ruthless politician. The mission involves infiltrating his heavily guarded and impenetrable mansion.

See also
List of Nigerian films of 2021

References

External links 
 

English-language Nigerian films
Nigerian action drama films
2021 action drama films
2021 films
2020s English-language films